Venus Williams defeated Vera Zvonareva in the final, 6–7(5–7), 6–0, 6–2 to win the singles tennis title at the 2008 WTA Tour Championships. It was her first Tour Finals title.

Venus became the third player in the Open Era after Steffi Graf and her sister Serena Williams to defeat the top-three ranked players at the same event; defeating world No. 2 Dinara Safina and No. 3 Serena in the respective round robin matches and No. 1 Jelena Janković in the semifinals.

Justine Henin was the two-time reigning champion, but retired from the sport in May 2008.

Seeds

Alternates

Draw

Finals

White group
Standings are determined by: 1. number of wins; 2. number of matches; 3. in two-players-ties, head-to-head records; 4. in three-players-ties, percentage of sets won, or of games won; 5. steering-committee decision.

Maroon group
Standings are determined by: 1. number of wins; 2. number of matches; 3. in two-players-ties, head-to-head records; 4. in three-players-ties, percentage of sets won, or of games won; 5. steering-committee decision.

See also
WTA Tour Championships appearances

References

External links
Draw

WTA Tour Championships - Singles
Singles 2008